Tin chloride can refer to:
Tin(II) chloride or stannous chloride (SnCl2)
Tin(IV) chloride or stannic chloride or tin tetrachloride (SnCl4)